BBC Yoruba is the Yoruba language service of the BBC World Service meant primarily for the Yoruba-speaking communities in Nigeria, Benin Republic, Togo and Yoruba speakers in diaspora It is part of the 12 new language services incorporated by the BBC World Service. The other languages are Afaan Oromo, Amharic, Gujarati, Igbo, Korean, Marathi, Pidgin, Punjabi, Telugu and Tigrinya.

History 
BBC Yoruba was launched on 19 February 2018 by the BBC.This was part of the expansion to accommodate twelve new languages under the funding of United Kingdom Government through the Foreign and Commonwealth Office (FCO) with an investment of 289 million pounds. This expansion is termed the BBC biggest expansion since the 1940's and it incorporated Yoruba language and few other Nigerian languages because of the achievement of BBC Hausa that was introduced sixty years ago.The BBC Director General, Tony Hall, said in part that:Also, the BBC head of West Africa, Oluwatoyosi Ogunseye stressed the importance of adding local languages to the BBC services. He remarked that:

Broadcast 
The BBC Yoruba was first aired with an interview with Wole Soyinka over the remarks made by former leaders Olusegun Obasanjo and Ibrahim Babangida with Soyinka saying that he would never associate himself with Obasanjo's national coalition.

Also, the news outlet will report news from a neutral point of view in addendum with  trending topics in sports, entertainment, business, health, education and women purely in the Yoruba language. The Editorial Lead of the project, Peter Okwoche explained that: 
Lastly, there is a 60-second audio summary of the activities of the BBC Yoruba on BBC Minute twice daily.

Media centre 
The BBC Bureau in Lagos State is the media centre of  the BBC Yoruba and other two new services; BBC Pidgin and BBC Igbo. The bureau was opened in March 2018 following the establishment of additional three new Languages in Nigeria. It has a TV studio, two radio stations and a place that can accommodate up to 200 people. It is also regarded as the headquarters for BBC in West Africa. Jamie Angus, Director of the BBC World Service, was present during the commissioning of the bureau and he said in part that:

See also 

BBC Urdu
BBC Persian
BBC Bangla
BBC Somali
BBC Hausa
BBC Igbo

External links 

yoruba service

References 

Yoruba language
BBC News